Horace Jansen Beemer (c. 1845 – July 22, 1912) was an American railway contractor and businessman active in Canada.

There is little known of Beemer before he came to Canada in the 1870s and was employed on the Welland Canal. He was soon involved in contracts of his own including a municipal water system in Quebec City and a railway contract with the :fr:Quebec and Lake St-John Railway. Up until about 1900, his business interest grew and prospered. After that time, his activity and influence diminished.

While Horace Beemer never became a top level decision-maker and financier, he did contribute substantially to the construction of railways and operation of related businesses.

He died in London in 1912.

References

External links
Biography at the Dictionary of Canadian Biography Online

1840s births
1912 deaths
American emigrants to Canada
19th-century American businesspeople